Baron Raimund von zur-Mühlen (sometimes "Raymond", "Raimund von Zur Mühlen") (10 November 1854 in Uusna Manor (Neu-Tennasilm), Viljandi Parish (now in Viiratsi Parish), Viljandi County, Governorate of Livonia – 11 December 1931 in Wiston, near Steyning, England) was a celebrated tenor Lieder singer who also became a famous teacher of singing, instructing many famous artists. His Lieder-interpretations are legendary.

Life and career 

He was a student of Auguste Hohenschildt, Felix Schmidt, Adolf Schulze, Julius Stockhausen and Clara Schumann. He made his debut in 1878, together with Hans Schmidt, in Riga. After this he continued working on his capabilities as a singer, above all with Manuel Garcia, Beniamino Carelli and Pauline Viardot.

He is recognised as a founder of the Lieder-abend or evening recital of the German concert Lieder as a distinct performance entity. His interpretation of Lieder and his specialist study of Lieder interpretation were of the utmost importance in the evolution of the Lieder genre itself. He gave Schumann Lieder-recitals with Clara Schumann. She set him on the path to London, where he gave his first concert in 1883. At one of his concerts, Johannes Brahms shouted out, 'Endlich, endlich habe ich meinen Sänger gefunden!' (At last, at last, I have found my singer).

Thereafter he spent much time in London. In 1907 he emigrated to England, with homes in London and Steyning. His last stay in Germany must have been in 1913–1914 in Berlin, where he gave a course of Masterclasses. Thereafter he lived in England for the remainder of his life. Here he met for the last time Monika Hunnius, author and singing-teacher, who had regularly studied with him in 1904–1911 at the Schloss Fellin or at Neuhausen, and developed a deep friendship with him.

In his younger days he usually appeared with his habitual accompanist and kindred spirit Hans Schmidt. Among his later accompanists were Victor Beigel and Coenraad V. Bos. Bos mentions him in his book: the singer gave his young accompanist no encouragement, but criticized him severely. After their fifth concert together he was told 'You must have played well today, for I did not notice you.' He was the teacher of Lula Mysz-Gmeiner (who taught Elisabeth Schwarzkopf), of Mark Raphael, Hans Lissman, Eva Jekelius-Lissman, Rose Walter, Eidé Norena, Georg A. Walter, Fanny Opfer, Naima Wifstrand, and Hermann Weißenborn, among many others.

He was considered an ideal Lieder singer. He is also described as an eccentric. He was born of an aristocratic family. His valuable collection of documents, musical and artistic papers were destroyed in 1930 in a great fire at his house near Steyning.

Sources 
 Dorothea von zur-Mühlen, Der Sänger Raimund von zur-Mühlen (Hannover,  1969).
 Monika Hunnius, Mein Weg zur Kunst.
 W. and R. Elwes, Gervase Elwes, The Story of his Life (Grayson and Grayson, London 1935).
 Gerald Moore, Am I too Loud (Harmondsworth 1966).
 H. Arnold Smith, 'Baron Raimund von zur-Mühlen: The Passing of a great Artist', Musical Times Vol 73 no 107 (1 April 1932), 316–320.
 Obituary, in Music and Letters 1932, .

External links 
Biographical essay, in German

References 

1854 births
1931 deaths
People from Viljandi Parish
People from the Governorate of Livonia
Livonian nobility
19th-century male opera singers from the Russian Empire
20th-century German male opera singers
Baltic German people from the Russian Empire
Emigrants from the Russian Empire to the United Kingdom
20th-century British male opera singers
People from Steyning
Baltic-German people